Emeric Tauss Torday (7 April 1897, in Budapest – 27 January 1987, in París) was a Hungarian painter trained in Budapest, Prague and Paris known for a number of paintings on display in museums both in Hungary and abroad.

History 
Emeric Tauss Torday was a disciple of the well-known Hungarian painter Fulop Laszlo. At the age of 17 he was awarded the Gold Medal of Artistic Merit in Budapest, which was bestowed upon him by the famous Spanish painter Ignacio Zuloaga.

In addition to being an eminent portraitist and landscape artist, Torday was an adjunct professor at The Sorbonne in Paris. He appears in the dictionary Le Benezit (Dictionnaire des peintres, sculpteurs, dessinateurs et graveurs), a directory of artists with works displayed in international museums.

Torday lived in Paris from 1934 until his death in 1987. In 1955 he travelled to Spain and painted a number of landscapes and portraits of notables such as Menendez Pidal and Gerardo Diego.

In 1946 Torday was part of an exposition of Hungarian painters organized by Jean Cassou, director of the Museum of Modern Art in Paris. One of Torday’s works that appears in this museum, titled L´homme au violon, was valued at that time at 1000 francs. The painting was a sold at auction on March 3, 1999 in Paris.

Salons and galleries showing Torday´s work 

National Salon of Paris
Salon d'Automne
Galerie Attica des Beaux-Arts (Paris)
Hungarian Embassy
State Museum of France
Déri Museum (Debrecen, Hungary)

Portraits 
M. Ollivier, granddaughter of celebrated Hungarian composer Franz Liszt
Jan Wils, architect of the Amsterdam Olympic Stadium
General Maurin, former French Minister of War
Count Karolyi, ex-president of the Hungarian Republic and Hungarian Ambassador to France, as well as his wife Countess Judith Karolyi
Cesar Rodríguez and Ramon Areces, founders of El Corte Ingles

Gallery

References

External links 

"L`homme au violon" auction information.
"2680" auction information.

1879 births
1987 deaths
20th-century Hungarian painters
Hungarian emigrants to France
Artists from Budapest